is a town and an island located in Ōshima District, Yamaguchi Prefecture, Japan.

Suō-Ōshima was formed on October 1, 2004 from the merger of the former towns of Ōshima, Kuka, Tachibana and Tōwa, all from towns of Ōshima District.

As of April 1, 2017, the town has an estimated population of 17,030. The total area is 138.17 km².

Suo-Oshima has established a sister island relationship with the County of Kauai, Hawaii in 1963. A 50th Anniversary commemoration was held on Kauai in October 2013. Current Mayors Takumi Shiiki (Suo-Oshima) and Bernard P. Carvalho, Jr. (Kauai) signed a Reaffirmation of Friendship agreement.

Geography

Climate
Suō-Ōshima has a humid subtropical climate (Köppen climate classification Cfa) with hot summers and cool winters. Precipitation is significant throughout the year, but is much higher in summer than in winter.

Demographics

Per Japanese census data, the population of Suō-Ōshima in 2020 is 14,798 people. Suō-Ōshima has been conducting censuses since 1920.

Education
Schools in Suo-Oshima:

Oshima Shosen, Suo-Oshima High School

Junior High Schools:
Towa JHS, Kuka JHS, Agenosho JHS, Oshima JHS

Elementary Schools:
Yuda ES, Morino ES, Joyama ES, Kuka ES, Agenosho ES, Shimanaka ES, Meishin ES, Migama ES, Okiura ES

References

External links
Suō-Ōshima official website 
Instagram #Suo-Oshima
Setouchifinder
Setouchifinder(in Japanese)
Kauai news 
Oshima Shosen students visit Kauai 
Museum of Japanese Emigration to Hawaii 

Towns in Yamaguchi Prefecture
Islands of the Seto Inland Sea
Islands of Yamaguchi Prefecture